David Sun may refer to:

 David Sun (businessman) (born 1951), American businessman and co-founder of Kingston Technology
 David Sun Tak-kei (born 1953), Director of Audit of Hong Kong and former president of Hong Kong Institute of Certified Public Accountants
 David Sun, Chinese businessman and CEO of Home Inn